Fern is the common name for plants in the class Polypodiopsida.

Fern may also refer to:

Places

In the United Kingdom
 Fern, Angus, see List of listed buildings in Fern, Angus
 Fern, Buckinghamshire, a hamlet

In the United States
 Fern, Iowa, an unincorporated community
 Fern, Pleasants County, West Virginia, an unincorporated community
 Fern, Wisconsin, a town
 Fern (community), Wisconsin, an unincorporated community

Other uses
 FERN, the Forests and the European Union Resource Network
 Fern (letter), in Ogham, a medieval British alphabet
 Fern (moth), common name of the geometer moth Horisme tersata
 Fern (name), a given name and surname
 Fern (rapper) (born 1979), Puerto Rican rapper
 Fern (TV series)
 USS Fern, several ships

See also
 
 Fearn (disambiguation)
 Ferns (disambiguation)